Philodromus femurostriatus is a spider species found in Greece and Turkey.

See also 
 List of Philodromidae species

References

External links 

femurostriatus
Spiders of Europe
Fauna of Greece
Spiders of Asia
Arthropods of Turkey
Spiders described in 2009